Khorolsky (masculine), Khorolskaya (feminine), or Khorolskoye (neuter) is the name of several rural localities in Russia:
Khorolsky, Saratov Oblast, a settlement in Dergachyovsky District of Saratov Oblast
Khorolsky, Voronezh Oblast, a settlement in Khorolskoye Rural Settlement of Talovsky District of Voronezh Oblast